John Victor Ryan (born John Lattin; 1 December 1890 – 13 October 1974) was an Australian politician. Born in Adelaide, South Australia, he was educated at state schools before becoming a baker. He was secretary of the Baking Trades Employees' Union before becoming South Australian Labor Party Campaign Director 1928–1950. At the 1949 election he was elected to the Australian Senate as a Labor Senator for South Australia, commencing on 1 July 1950. He held the seat until his parliamentary retirement on 30 June 1959.

Ryan died in 1974.

References

1890 births
1974 deaths
Australian Labor Party members of the Parliament of Australia
Members of the Australian Senate for South Australia
Members of the Australian Senate
20th-century Australian politicians